"You Drive" is episode 134 of the American television anthology series The Twilight Zone. It originally aired on January 3, 1964, on CBS. In this episode, the perpetrator of a fatal hit-and-run is hounded by the car he committed the crime with. Earl Hamner Jr. reprised this story, as he had already used it in the 1954 TV series 'Justice'.

Opening narration
The narration begins with Oliver Pope driving.

The narration continues after Pope commits the hit-and run:

Plot
Oliver ("Ollie") Pope is an office manager who is nervous and distracted; his mind is not on his driving. As a result, he slams his 1956 Ford Fairlane Club Sedan into Timmy Danbers, a young boy delivering newspapers on a bicycle, injuring him seriously enough that the boy eventually dies of his injuries. Pope stops but then, instead of offering aid, hurries off, trying to conceal his part in the accident. His wife Lillian and his co-workers notice that he is increasingly irritable. A co-worker named Pete Radcliff is inaccurately identified as the perpetrator by a witness and Pope does nothing to change that error.

Before long, Pope's Ford seems to take on a mind of its own, rebelling against its owner. At first, when Ollie is near the car, it honks its horn, flashes its lights, attempts to start on its own, drops its bumper, tries to close its hood on him, and repeats the radio newsflash of the boy's death in an attempt to get Ollie's attention. Then, while his wife is driving the Fairlane, it drives to the scene of the accident and stalls out, seemingly determined to get Pope to admit his guilt. Pope makes excuses to his wife and continues trying to cover up his crime.

Pope starts walking to work in an effort to avoid his car (and having any of what's been happening seen by the police). One day, he heads out into the rain and the Fairlane leaves the garage on its own, chasing him relentlessly along the street. Finally, Pope falls, but the car stops just before running him down. The passenger door opens, and Pope gets in. The Fairlane drives him to a police station, and Pope gets out and walks in to confess.

Closing narration

Cast
 Edward Andrews as Oliver Pope
 Helen Westcott as Lillian Pope
 Kevin Hagen as Pete Radcliff
 Totty Ames as Muriel Hastings
 Michael Gorfain as Timmy Danbers, newspaper boy
 John Hanek as Policeman
 Robert McCord as Passerby

Production notes

External shots (involving the car) of Pope's home and the park were filmed in a neighborhood in Culver City, California. The house that served as Pope's home still stands at 4183 Keystone Avenue (the address appears on an exterior shot in the episode) and the nearby park where the accident took place is the Dr. Paul Carlson Memorial Park. It is located a few blocks from the Sony Pictures (formerly MGM) lot. The scenes where Pope is chased by his car were filmed on Jasmine Avenue. The home at 4262 (as shown in the episode) has since been replaced. However, the adjoining yard that he runs through (and house) are still there and readily identifiable.

Edward Andrews refused to appear in the scene where Oliver Pope is almost run over by his car. His stand-in was actually "pinned" underneath the front tire.

When Mrs. Pope calls the tow truck operator from a phone booth, she says her car is at the intersection of 3rd and Park.  When Mr. Pope hears the late news report from his car radio, the newscaster says the accident took place at 3rd and Elm.

References

Sources
 DeVoe, Bill. (2008). Trivia from The Twilight Zone. Albany, GA: Bear Manor Media. 
 Grams, Martin. (2008). The Twilight Zone: Unlocking the Door to a Television Classic. Churchville, MD: OTR Publishing.

External links

1964 American television episodes
The Twilight Zone (1959 TV series season 5) episodes
Television episodes about driving under the influence